Majuli district  is the largest river island in the world, situated on the Brahmaputra River in Northeastern Assam. It is also the first island district of the country. It is populated by Misings.

On June 27, 2016 an additional district was announced by Sarbananda Sonowal, taking the total number from 32 to 33 after Majuli was carved out of the Northern parts of Jorhat.

Administration
The district consists of two circle, Majuli. The Deputy Commissioner is Bikram Kairi, IAS.

Economy

The main industry is agriculture, with paddy being the chief crop. Majuli has a rich and diverse agricultural tradition, with as many as 100 varieties of rice grown, all without pesticides or artificial fertilisers.

Handloom is a major occupation among the distaff population of the villages. Although largely a non-commercial occupation, it keeps many of the inhabitants occupied. Weaving is exquisite and intricate with the use of a variety of colours and textures of cotton and silk, especially Muga silk.

Among the fascinating arrays of rice produced are the Komal Saul, a unique type that can be eaten after immersing the grains in warm water for 15 minutes and usually eaten as a breakfast cereal; the bao dhan, that grows under water and is harvested after ten months and the Bora saul, a sticky brown rice used to make the traditional cake known as pitha. Fishing, dairying, pottery, handloom and boat-making are other important economic activities.

Demographics 
As of the 2011 census, Majuli district has a population of 1,67,304. Scheduled Castes make up 23,878 (14.27%), while Scheduled Tribes make up 77,603 (46.38%) of the population.

165,699 are Hindus which is 99.04% of the population.

At the time of the 2011 census, 54.47% of the population spoke Assamese, 41.01% Mising, 1.66% Bengali and 1.22% Deori as their first language.

Politics

Majuli (Vidhan Sabha constituency) falls under the 99 constituency of legislative assembly of Assam. It is a reserved seat for the Scheduled tribes (ST).  Majuli is one of the 9 assembly segments of Lakhimpur Lok Sabha constituency. At present Sarbananda Sonowal (2014-) is the Member of Parliament from Bharatiya Janata Party and was the Union Minister of State-Independent Charge for Sports & Youth Affairs, Skill Development & Entrepreneurship but resigned after becoming Chief Minister of Assam.

It is under jurisdiction of Mising Autonomous Council having three constituencies. Rajib Lochan Pegu won the seat [2001-2006 & 2006-2011, 2011- 2016] was MLA from Mājuli in Assam Assembly until 2016. He was bearing the portfolio of Minister of State (Ind.), Water Resources Dev., WPT & BC, in the Government of Assam.

See also

Jadav Payeng
Tourism in Assam
List of villages in Majuli

References

External links
 Official website

 
Districts of Assam
2016 establishments in Assam